Mass point geometry, colloquially known as mass points, is a problem-solving technique in geometry which applies the physical principle of the center of mass to geometry problems involving triangles and intersecting cevians.  All problems that can be solved using mass point geometry can also be solved using either similar triangles, vectors, or area ratios, but many students prefer to use mass points.  Though modern mass point geometry was developed in the 1960s by New York high school students, the concept has been found to have been used as early as 1827 by August Ferdinand Möbius in his theory of homogeneous coordinates.

Definitions 

The theory of mass points is defined according to the following definitions:
 Addition - The sum of two mass points  and  has mass  and point  where  is the point on  such that . An example of mass point addition is shown at right. Mass point addition is closed, commutative, and associative.
 Scalar Multiplication - Given a mass point  and a positive real scalar , we define multiplication to be .  Mass point scalar multiplication is distributive over mass point addition.

Methods

Concurrent cevians 
First, a point is assigned with a mass (often a whole number, but it depends on the problem) in the way that other masses are also whole numbers.
The principle of calculation is that the foot of a cevian is the addition (defined above) of the two vertices (they are the endpoints of the side where the foot lie).
For each cevian, the point of concurrency is the sum of the vertex and the foot.
Each length ratio may then be calculated from the masses at the points.  See Problem One for an example.

Splitting masses 
Splitting masses is the slightly more complicated method necessary when a problem contains transversals in addition to cevians.  Any vertex that is on both sides the transversal crosses will have a split mass.  A point with a split mass may be treated as a normal mass point, except that it has three masses: one used for each of the two sides it is on, and one that is the sum of the other two split masses and is used for any cevians it may have.  See Problem Two for an example.

Other methods 
 Routh's theorem - Many problems involving triangles with cevians will ask for areas, and mass points does not provide a method for calculating areas.  However, Routh's theorem, which goes hand in hand with mass points, uses ratios of lengths to calculate the ratio of areas between a triangle and a triangle formed by three cevians.
 Special cevians - When given cevians with special properties, like an angle bisector or an altitude, other theorems may be used alongside mass point geometry that determine length ratios.  One very common theorem used likewise is the angle bisector theorem.
 Stewart's theorem - When asked not for the ratios of lengths but for the actual lengths themselves, Stewart's theorem may be used to determine the length of the entire segment, and then mass points may be used to determine the ratios and therefore the necessary lengths of parts of segments.
 Higher dimensions - The methods involved in mass point geometry are not limited to two dimensions; the same methods may be used in problems involving tetrahedra, or even higher-dimensional shapes, though it is rare that a problem involving four or more dimensions will require use of mass points.

Examples

Problem One 
Problem.

Solution. We may arbitrarily assign the mass of point  to be . See diagram at right.

Problem Two 
Problem.

Solution. As this problem involves a transversal, we must use split masses on point . We may arbitrarily assign the mass of point  to be .

Problem Three 
Problem.

Solution.

 System One.
 System Two. As this system involves a transversal, we must use split masses on point .
 Original System. We now know all the ratios necessary to put together the ratio we are asked for.  The final answer may be found as follows:

See also 
 Cevian
 Ceva's theorem
 Menelaus's theorem
 Stewart's theorem
 Angle bisector theorem
 Routh's theorem
 Barycentric coordinates
 Lever

Notes 

Geometric centers
Triangle geometry